Sir Sherard Louis Cowper-Coles   (born 8 January 1955) is a British former diplomat.  He was the Foreign Secretary's Special Representative to Afghanistan and Pakistan in 2009–2010. After leaving the Foreign Office, he worked briefly for BAE Systems as international business development director. He left BAE Systems in 2013 and is now a Senior Adviser to the Group chairman and the Group Chief Executive of HSBC.

Early life and education
Sherard Cowper-Coles is the son of Sherard Hamilton Cowper-Coles and Dorothy (née Short). His grandfather, the metallurgist Sherard Osborn Cowper-Coles, was the son of naval inventor Captain Cowper Phipps Coles.   He was educated at Freston Lodge School, New Beacon School, Tonbridge School and Hertford College, Oxford, where he read classics.

In 1982, he married Bridget Mary Elliott. Her father was Neil Elliott, a prominent land agent whose brother was the actor Denholm Elliott and whose father had been assassinated while serving as Solicitor-General to the Mandatory Government of Palestine in 1933 and who was buried in Mount Zion Cemetery, Jerusalem. The couple have four sons, Henry Sherard, Rupert Neil, Frederick Peter and Myles Philip, and one daughter, Minna Louise.

In 2011, he divorced Bridget Mary Elliott and married Jasmine Zerinini, a French diplomat, in 2012. They have a daughter, Louise Elizabeth.

Diplomatic career
Cowper-Coles entered the diplomatic service in 1977. He was Third Secretary and later Second Secretary in Cairo, 1980–83, First Secretary in the Planning Staff of the Foreign and Commonwealth Office, 1983–85; Private Secretary to the Permanent Under-secretary of State, 1985–87, First Secretary in Washington, 1987–91, Assistant in the Security Policy Department of the FCO, 1991–93, Resident Associate, International Institute for Strategic Studies, 1993–94; Head of the Hong Kong Department of the FCO, 1994–97, Political Counsellor in Paris, 1997–99; Principal Private Secretary to Robin Cook, the Secretary of State for Foreign and Commonwealth Affairs, 1999–2001.

His first role as a head of mission was in Tel Aviv as the British Ambassador to Israel from 2001 to 2003. He was next appointed Ambassador to Saudi Arabia in Riyadh, a post that he held until 2006. From 15 May 2007 until April 2009 he served as Ambassador to Afghanistan in Kabul.

In February 2009 it was announced that he would be taking up a new role as special representative of the UK Foreign Secretary to Afghanistan and Pakistan.

He attracted controversy in October 2008 when a leaked French diplomatic cable suggested he had been sharply critical of Karzai and US policy. While insisting Britain should support the US, he was quoted as saying: "We should tell them that we want to be part of a winning strategy, not a losing one."

This memo leak occurred the same week another additional memo was leaked concerning fellow British ambassador, Sir Nigel Sheinwald's comments with regard to United States Senator Barack Obama. Both leaks concerned foreign policy and occurred in the final weeks of the 2008 US presidential election.

In early 2010 it was reported that he clashed with senior NATO and US officials over his insistence that the military-driven counter-insurgency effort was headed for failure, and that talks with the Taliban should be prioritised.

On 21 June 2010, the British high commission announced he had taken "extended leave" from his position in Afghanistan. Following comments from the Foreign Secretary, William Hague, it appeared unlikely he would return to the post.

Post-diplomatic career
In 2011, Sir Sherard Cowper-Coles became BAE Systems' international business development director, focusing on the Middle East and south-east Asia. He is a committee member of the Saudi-British Society.

His appointment at BAE caused some controversy, since he is thought to have "had a profound effect" on the decision by Robert Wardle, then director of the UK's Serious Fraud Office, to end an investigation into BAE's allegedly corrupt dealings with Saudi Arabia.

In 2013 and 2014 he participated in the Bilderberg Conferences.

Honours

Cowper-Coles was appointed a Lieutenant of the Royal Victorian Order (LVO) in 1991 and made a Companion of the Order of St Michael and St George (CMG) in the 1997 Birthday Honours and a Knight Commander of the Order in the 2004 Birthday Honours.

Published works
 (2012) Cables from Kabul: The Inside Story of the West's Afghanistan Campaign
 (2013) Ever the Diplomat: Confessions of a Foreign Office Mandarin

References

External links
 Telegraph report of appointment to Kabul
 Kabul embassy biography
 Haaretz interview
 Robert Fisk column about Sherard Cowper-Coles

 

Living people
1955 births
Alumni of Hertford College, Oxford
Ambassadors of the United Kingdom to Israel
Ambassadors of the United Kingdom to Afghanistan
Ambassadors of the United Kingdom to Saudi Arabia
Knights Commander of the Order of St Michael and St George
People educated at Tonbridge School
Lieutenants of the Royal Victorian Order
Principal Private Secretaries to the Secretary of State for Foreign and Commonwealth Affairs
Members of HM Diplomatic Service
20th-century British diplomats